Q47 may refer to:
 Q47 (New York City bus)
 
 Muhammad (surah), the 47th surah of the Quran